David Wijnveldt (December 15, 1891 in Jember, Java – March 28, 1962 in Zutphen) was a Dutch amateur football (soccer) player who competed in the 1912 Summer Olympics. He was part of the Dutch team, which won the bronze medal in the football tournament.

References

External links
 
 

1891 births
1962 deaths
Dutch footballers
Footballers at the 1912 Summer Olympics
Olympic footballers of the Netherlands
Olympic bronze medalists for the Netherlands
Netherlands international footballers
Olympic medalists in football
People from Jember Regency
Medalists at the 1912 Summer Olympics
Association football defenders